Bruno III of Isenburg-Braunsberg was the Count of Isenburg-Braunsberg from 1255 until 1278.

1278 deaths
House of Isenburg
Year of birth unknown